Maurice Joseph L'Abbé (born August 12, 1947) is a Canadian former ice hockey player who played 5 games in the National Hockey League with the Chicago Black Hawks during the 1972–73 season. The rest of his career, which lasted from 1968 to 1976, was spent in various minor leagues.

Playing career
L'Abbé was drafted by the Chicago Black Hawks in the 1964 NHL Amateur Draft in the fourth round, 22nd overall. It was not until almost a decade later, in 1972–73 that he actually made it to the NHL level. Prior to making it to the NHL, he had played in five different minor leagues on five different teams. His big break into the NHL would not last long, though. After only five games (and one assist), he was sent back down to the minors, where he finished off his career playing for the Dallas Black Hawks of the Central Hockey League.

Career statistics

Regular season and playoffs

External links
 

1947 births
Living people
Canadian ice hockey centres
Chicago Blackhawks draft picks
Chicago Blackhawks players
Dallas Black Hawks players
Flint Generals players
Greensboro Generals (EHL) players
Ice hockey people from Montreal
St. Catharines Black Hawks players